Kareela was a short-lived railway station on the Main South railway line in New South Wales, Australia. It opened in 1889, 169 km south of Sydney, originally as Wollondilly, and closed in 1915.

References

Disused regional railway stations in New South Wales
Railway stations in Australia opened in 1889
Railway stations closed in 1915